John Thomas Madden A.M., C.P.A., Ph.D. (1882–1949) was an educator and business leader who served as the dean of NYU School of Business, introduced much of the modern procurement process, and served as president of Theta Nu Epsilon from 1926-1932  and Beta Alpha Psi, the finance, accounting and information systems fraternity from 1930–1932.

Dean Madden was born to a New York City family, and was raised in the Protestant church. He was educated at Yale and New York University and worked both as an instructor and administrator at the latter while he was engaged in business as an accountant; he was also a member of Alpha Kappa Psi professional business fraternity.

From 1927–1940, Madden was dean of New York University's business school, serving as a professor through the thirties until 1947, while rendering procurement training to the military in World War II.  Dean Madden started an early form of inmate education using his faculty at Sing Sing. Dean Madden is quoted as saying "This idea is a mighty fine one, especially at this time. There are many men here who would not have been here five years ago. They committed no strange offenses. They merely carried on the business practices they had been used to. But these practices, with the advent of Depression, became criminal."

In 1929, Dean Madden became the third President of Alexander Hamilton Institute, a highly successful distance education business course started by his fellow New York University (NYU) instructor and predecessor as dean.

Dean Madden was also the major figure in developing the modern, professional procurement process.  He stated in his text, "Budgetary Control" (1930) that it "became apparent that, due to the amount of dollars at stake, purchases are more effectively handled by an individual who could concentrate on the business of procurement. In transforming requests into materials for their organizations, procurement professionals also have to perform market analysis and do product forecasting as well as understand the law of contracts."

Dean Madden authored numerous texts of accounting, currency, mortgage banking and other business practices  ; accounting historian Julia Grant names him as one of the "fathers of modern accounting". 

The educator and business leader was president of Theta Nu Epsilon from 1926–1932, and again (of the splintered TNE) from 1935 to 1946 and was active in the Andiron Club. The previous presidents of Theta Nu Epsilon were Joseph James Hartigan and Clarence J. Hand, students of Mr. Madden's at New York University (NYU).

The John T. Madden Memorial Award at NYU's Stern School of Business are named in his honor and in recognition of his achievements.

1882 births
1948 deaths
New York University alumni
Yale University alumni
New York University faculty
American accountants